Gaspee Point is a small peninsula on the west side of the southern reaches of the Providence River in Warwick, Rhode Island.   It is bounded on the north by Passeonkquis Cove and on the south by Occupessatuxet Cove.  It is reached via Namquid Drive in Warwick.

Gaspee Point was the site of one of the first acts of hostility in the American Revolution when the British Royal Navy vessel HMS Gaspee was grounded there on June 9, 1772 in what became known as the Gaspée Affair. The Gaspee was a revenue schooner locally detested for its enforcement of the unpopular Navigation Acts, and she was boarded and burned by a band of local citizens that night.

The site was added to the National Register of Historic Places in 1972.

See also
National Register of Historic Places listings in Kent County, Rhode Island

References

Conflict sites on the National Register of Historic Places in Rhode Island
Warwick, Rhode Island
Geography of Kent County, Rhode Island
American Revolution on the National Register of Historic Places
National Register of Historic Places in Kent County, Rhode Island